The men's 400 metre freestyle competition of the swimming events at the 2013 Mediterranean Games took place on June 21 at the Mersin Olympic Swimming Pool in Mersin, Turkey. Oussama Mellouli of Tunisia was the defending champion from the 2009 Mediterranean Games.

This race consisted of eight lengths of the pool in freestyle.

Schedule 
All times are Eastern European Summer Time (UTC+03:00)

Records
Prior to this competition, the existing world and Mediterranean Games records were as follows:

Results

Heats

References

Swimming at the 2013 Mediterranean Games